Ahmad Heryawan (born 19 June 1966) is an Indonesian politician who served as the Governor of West Java Province between 2008 and 2018. He was inaugurated in April 2008, after winning the West Java gubernatorial election in March 2008.
Ahmad Heryawan, together with his running mate Yusuf Macan Effendie (also known as Dede Yusuf), was the governor candidate from the Prosperous Justice Party (PKS) and National Mandate Party (PAN) coalition, running the gubernatorial election against Agum Gumelar – Nu'man Abdul Hakim from Indonesian Democratic Party of Struggle (PDIP) and United Development Party (PPP) coalition and Danny Setiawan – Iwan Ridwan Sulandjana from Golkar and Democratic Party (PD) coalition.

Before entering the gubernatorial election, Ahmad Heryawan was a member of Jakarta House of Representatives, taking position as one of the vice chairmen of the house.

His second term as governor ended on 13 June 2018 and he was replaced by acting governor Iwa Karniwa.

References 

1966 births
Living people
Governors of West Java
Indonesian Muslims
Politicians from Jakarta
People from Sukabumi
Prosperous Justice Party politicians
Sundanese people